Sir Stephen Creswell Timms (born 29 July 1955) is a British politician who served as Chief Secretary to the Treasury from 2006 to 2007. A member of the Labour Party, he has been Member of Parliament (MP) for East Ham, formerly Newham North East, since 1994.

Timms served in the New Labour governments of Tony Blair and Gordon Brown under several portfolios. He served for three periods as Financial Secretary to the Treasury; from 1999 to 2001, 2004 to 2005 and 2008 to 2010. As Chief Secretary to the Treasury, Timms attended Cabinet from 2006 to 2007.

In May 2010, Timms survived an attempted murder by Islamist terrorist Roshonara Choudhry who stabbed him twice in the abdomen at his constituency surgery. His attacker was convicted of attempted murder and sentenced to life imprisonment.

Timms served on the Official Opposition frontbench as Shadow Minister for Employment and later served in the Shadow Cabinet as Shadow Secretary of State for Work and Pensions. He returned to the backbenches in September 2015.

Early life
Timms was born in Oldham, Lancashire, to Ronald James Timms, an engineer, and Margaret Joyce Timms, a teacher. He was educated at Farnborough Grammar School in Farnborough, Hampshire, and read mathematics at Emmanuel College, Cambridge, where he gained a degree in mathematics in 1977 and an MPhil in operational research in 1978.

Before entering politics, Timms worked in the telecommunications industry for 15 years, first for Logica from 1978 to 1986, and then for Ovum from 1986 to 1994, where he worked as a manager responsible for producing reports on the future of telecommunications. He was elected as a councillor for the Little Ilford Ward on Newham London Borough Council in a by-election in 1984, and served as Leader of the Council from 1990 to 1994.

Member of Parliament
The Labour MP for Newham North East, Ron Leighton, died in February 1994. Timms was selected as the Labour candidate for the resulting by-election in June 1994. He won the seat with 75% of the votes.

For the next election, his constituency was merged with part of Newham South, and at the general election in May 1997 Timms was elected MP for the resulting new constituency of East Ham.

In government
Timms served as Parliamentary Private Secretary to Andrew Smith from May 1997 to March 1998, and later to Mo Mowlam from March to July 1998.

In 1998, Timms was appointed Parliamentary Under-Secretary of State at the Department of Social Security, rising to Minister of State in that department the following year.

Chief Secretary to the Treasury
In May 2006, Timms was promoted to the Cabinet as Chief Secretary to the Treasury, the chancellor's second-in-command with responsibility for department budget issues, a post in which he remained until 28 June 2007, when he was dropped from the cabinet by new prime minister Gordon Brown. It was later announced that he had been appointed Minister of State for Competitiveness at the newly created Department for Business, Enterprise and Regulatory Reform.

Minister for Employment and Welfare Reform
Following the government reshuffle on 24 January 2008—a result of the resignation of Peter Hain—Timms moved to the Department for Work and Pensions, and became Minister for Employment and Welfare Reform.

Financial Secretary to the Treasury
Tony McNulty replaced Timms on 3 October 2008, who returned to his former role as Financial Secretary to the Treasury.

In August 2009, Timms was given additional responsibility for Digital Britain. In September 2009, he announced plans for a tax of £6 per year to be levied on each phone account in the UK. At the time, this was broadly characterised as a stealth tax in the UK media. In April 2010, Timms' department made an embarrassing slip when a letter purporting to be from him mistakenly identified IP address as "intellectual property address". According to the accountants' magazine Accountancy Age, he was highly regarded by finance professionals despite such gaffes.

In opposition
Timms was appointed to the role of Shadow Minister for Employment after the election of Ed Miliband as party leader.

It was rumoured that Timms was one of three shadow ministers who threatened to resign from his front bench position if the Labour Party did not grant a free vote on the Marriage (Same Sex Couples) Act 2013. Timms later abstained on the bill.

When Rachel Reeves went on maternity leave after the 2015 general election, Timms took over as acting Shadow Secretary of State for Work and Pensions in the Shadow Cabinet of Harriet Harman. Following the 2015 Labour Party leadership election, he was offered a junior shadow Treasury position by new leader Jeremy Corbyn but chose to turn it down and return to the backbenches.

Timms supported Owen Smith in the failed attempt to replace Jeremy Corbyn in the 2016 Labour leadership election.

In April 2021, Timms praised the work of the controversial Jesus House Church on Twitter. His tweet came after an official apology from Labour leader Keir Starmer, who had admitted it had been a "mistake" to film a promotional video at the church when it had come to light that the pastor of the church, Agu Irukwu, had previously opposed same sex marriage and equality legislation. LGBT+ Labour said they were "disappointed" to see Timms' tweet so soon after Starmer's apology, after Timms was criticised for supporting the "anti-LGBTQ+" church.

On 23 August 2021, Prime Minister Boris Johnson appointed Timms as the UK's trade envoy to Switzerland and Liechtenstein.

Timms was knighted in the 2022 Birthday Honours for political and public service.

Murder attempt 

On 14 May 2010, Timms was approached by 21-year-old female Islamist extremist Roshonara Choudhry, during a constituency surgery at the Beckton Globe Library in Kingsford Way, Beckton, East London. Choudhry stabbed Timms twice in the abdomen with a 15 cm (6-inch) kitchen knife, before being disarmed. She stated that she had been influenced by watching sermons of Anwar al-Awlaki, a leader of al-Qaeda in the Arabian Peninsula, and that her attack was to punish Timms for voting for the Iraq War, and seek revenge for the Iraqi people.

He suffered "potentially life-threatening" wounds—lacerations to his liver and a perforation to his stomach. Timms underwent emergency surgery at the Royal London Hospital, from which he was discharged on 19 May.

On 2 November 2010, Choudhry was found guilty of Timms' attempted murder. She was subsequently sentenced to life imprisonment with a minimum term of 15 years. After the court case, Timms said he was not bitter, but that forgiveness was not possible because his attacker showed no remorse. He has since sought the banning of incendiary material on popular internet sites "to protect other vulnerable young people from going down the same road." YouTube removed some videos of al-Awlaki within hours of the sentence.

After the murder of David Amess, Timms said in parliament that he would like to meet Choudhry, so "he can finally forgive her".

Personal life
Timms is an evangelical Christian. He is passionate about Christians entering politics and is a keen supporter of Just Love, a social justice movement working with Christian students. He has lived in the London Borough of Newham since 1979, and has been married to Hui-Leng Lim since 1986.

Notes

References

External links

 
 Newham Labour Party 
 

|-

|-

|-

|-

|-

|-

|-

1955 births
Living people
Alumni of Emmanuel College, Cambridge
Councillors in the London Borough of Newham
English Christian socialists
English victims of crime
Labour Party (UK) MPs for English constituencies
Members of the Privy Council of the United Kingdom
People from Farnborough, Hampshire
People from Oldham
Stabbing survivors
UK MPs 1992–1997
UK MPs 1997–2001
UK MPs 2001–2005
UK MPs 2005–2010
UK MPs 2010–2015
UK MPs 2015–2017
UK MPs 2017–2019
UK MPs 2019–present
People educated at Sixth Form College, Farnborough
Knights Bachelor
Politicians awarded knighthoods
Chief Secretaries to the Treasury